William Blake Stein (born August 3, 1973) is an American former professional baseball pitcher. He played in Major League Baseball (MLB) for the Oakland Athletics and Kansas City Royals from -.

Career
On June 2, 1994, he was drafted by the St. Louis Cardinals in the 6th round of the 1994 amateur draft. On July 31, he was traded by the Cardinals with Eric Ludwick and T. J. Mathews to the Oakland Athletics for Mark McGwire. On July 31, he was traded by the Athletics with Jeff D'Amico and Brad Rigby to the Kansas City Royals for Kevin Appier. On June 17, Stein fanned eight straight Brewers for the Royals, and 11 in five 2/3 innings, but Milwaukee defeated Kansas City, 5-2. Only Nolan Ryan (twice), Ron Davis, and Roger Clemens had struck out eight in a row in the American League. Tigers pitcher Doug Fister would break this record on September 27, striking out nine Royals, but receiving a no-decision in a 5-4 Detroit victory.

When starting for the Athletics against the Cleveland Indians on 31 August 1998, Stein was unable to get out any of the first eight Indian batters out - the inning started walk-hit batsman-walk-single-single-walk-single-single, giving the Indians a 6-0 lead. Stein was pulled from the game by manager Art Howe, and became the first starting pitcher in Major League history to fail to get out any of the first eight batters of the game.

After retiring from baseball, Stein attended Spring Hill College and graduated in 2005. He is now Assistant Principal for Discipline and Attendance at McGill-Toolen Catholic High School.

See also
 List of Major League Baseball single-inning strikeout leaders

References

External links
 Baseball Reference

1973 births
Living people
Altoona Curve players
American expatriate baseball players in Canada
Akron Aeros players
Baseball players from Mississippi
Edmonton Trappers players
Harrisburg Senators players
Huntsville Stars players
Johnson City Cardinals players
Kansas City Royals players
Major League Baseball pitchers
Nashville Sounds players
Oakland Athletics players
People from McComb, Mississippi
Peoria Chiefs players
Spring Hill Badgers baseball players
St. Petersburg Cardinals players
Vancouver Canadians players
Wichita Wranglers players
Anchorage Glacier Pilots players